Jo Hee-bong (born August 23, 1971) is a South Korean actor. Hee-bong began his acting career in 1997 as part of the theatre troupe Bipa (비파). He later became known as a supporting actor onscreen, in films such as Blind (2011) and Incomplete Life: Prequel (2013), and the television dramas Hong Gil-dong (2008), Unsolved (2010), and Good Doctor (2013).

In a collaboration with director Kim Tae-yong, Jo is also the live narrator (or byeonsa) for Crossroads of Youth (1934), Korea's oldest surviving silent film. Aside from local performances in 2008 and 2012, Jo has performed at the 2009 New York Film Festival, the 2011 Guwahati International Film Festival in Mexico, the 2011 Thames Festival in London, and the 2013 Berlin International Film Festival.

Filmography

Film

TV Movies

Television series

Theater

Awards and nominations

References

External links
 Jo Hee-bong at Starvillage Entertainment
 Jo Hee-bong Fan Cafe at Daum 
 
 
 

1971 births
Living people
South Korean male television actors
South Korean male film actors
South Korean male stage actors
Sogang University alumni